Trumpet Island is a 1920 American silent drama film directed by Tom Terriss and starring Marguerite De La Motte, Wallace MacDonald, and Hallam Cooley.

Cast
 Marguerite De La Motte as Eve de Merincourt 
 Wallace MacDonald as Richard Bedell 
 Hallam Cooley as Allen Marsh 
 Josef Swickard as Jacques de Merincourt 
 Arthur Hoyt as Henry Caron 
 Marcella Daly as Hilda 
 Percy Challenger as Valinsky

References

Bibliography
 George A. Katchmer. Eighty Silent Film Stars: Biographies and Filmographies of the Obscure to the Well Known. McFarland, 1991.

External links

1920 films
1920 drama films
Silent American drama films
Films directed by Tom Terriss
American silent feature films
1920s English-language films
American black-and-white films
Vitagraph Studios films
1920s American films